Her Honor, Nancy James is a radio soap opera in the United States. It was broadcast Monday - Friday on CBS October 3, 1938 - July 28, 1939.

Format
Her Honor, Nancy James related "the dramatic events in the restoration of a big city which has been overrun by corrupt politicians who have intimidated law-abiding citizens and undermined legitimate business with their rackets." The program featured "dramatic incidents in the life of Nancy James, a judge in the Court of Common Relations in Metropolis City." It was described as being one of "two sympathetic portrayals of judges" during the golden age of radio" and as an example of how "The popular culture at the time ... glamorized single working women and affirmed their active role in public life."

After having been a social worker, the title character was appointed to be the judge of a "special Court of Common Problems."

Personnel
The title role was played by Barbara Weeks. Others in the cast and their roles are shown in the table below.

Source: On the Air: The Encyclopedia of Old-Time Radio, except as indicated.

Mel Allen was the program's narrator; Frank Gallop was the announcer. Basil Loughrane was the director. The program's writers were Dave Victor and Herbert Little, Jr.

References 

American radio soap operas
1930s American radio programs
CBS Radio programs